The  Miss Illinois Teen USA competition is the pageant that selects the representative for the state of Illinois in the Miss Teen USA pageant. It is directed by Vanbros and Associates and is previously directed by D&D Productions from 2001 to 2014 before becoming part of Vanbros organization in 2014, headquartered in Lenexa, Kansas.

Illinois is in the top fifteen states in terms of number and value of placements over the twenty-three years of the Miss Teen USA competition. Illinois ties with Florida and North Carolina for the most Miss Photogenic awards won at Miss Teen USA (3) and has won more awards than any other state. Like the Miss USA Pageant, Illinois went on to win the Miss Teen USA title in the second edition of the pageant.

Three Illinois teens have competed at Miss USA, although none won the Miss Illinois USA title. The first was Cherise Haugen, Illinois' only Miss Teen USA, who competed as Miss Teen USA at the 1985 pageant (the first few Miss Teen USAs were given this opportunity). Later two more would compete at the Miss USA pageant, representing Vanbros states: Terri Bollinger represented Missouri in 1999 and Anne-Marie Dixon Oklahoma in 1998. Vanbros is a pageant production company that owns the Miss Teen USA franchises for, and produces and directs, several state pageants in the Midwest. The Miss Illinois Teen USA Pageant has been the single largest official state preliminary competition with over 150 contestants every year since at least 2002 and has always ranked among the top ten largest state preliminary pageants. 

Dawn Parks of Chicago was crowned Miss Illinois Teen USA 2022 on May 30, 2022, at Braden Auditorium in Normal. She will represent Illinois for the title of Miss Teen USA 2022.

Results summary

Placements
Miss Teen USA: Cherise Haugen (1984)
First runners-up:  Autumn Waterbury (1997), Lexi Atkins (2010)
Third runners-up: Kathleen McClelland (1988), Kelly Cruse (2005), Sydni Dion Bennett (2018)
Top 6: Anne-Marie Dixon (1995)
Top 10: Lisa Jessen (1985), Nicole Manske (1998)
Top 12: Julee Kleffman (1992)
Top 15: Victoria Davis (2007), Olivia Pura (2016), A’Maiya Allen (2019)
Top 16: Alexandra Plotz (2012)
Illinois holds a record of 14 placements at Miss Teen USA.

Awards
Miss Photogenic: Linda Burkholder (1983), Lisa Jessen (1985), Kathleen McClelland (1988)

Winners 

1 Age at the time of the Miss Teen USA pageant

References

External links
Official website

Illinois
Women in Illinois